The eighth competition weekend of the 2008–09 ISU Speed Skating World Cup was a two-day event focusing on allround-events, held in Thialf, Heerenveen, Netherlands, from Saturday, 14 February, until Sunday, 15 February 2009.

Schedule of events
The schedule of the event is not yet communicated but the distances are already announced:
 1500 m (men and women)
 5000 m (women)
 10000 m (men)

Medal winners

Men's events

Women's events

References

8
Isu World Cup, 2008-09, 8
ISU Speed Skating World Cup, 2008-09, World Cup 8